M.I. Hummel may refer to:

Maria Innocentia Hummel, the artist and designer
Hummel figurines, porcelain figurines based on the drawings of Sister Maria Innocentia Hummel